This is a list of the 630 members of the Italian Chamber of Deputies that were elected in the 2008 general election.

Democratic Party

The People of Freedom

Mixed Group

Independents

Great South–PPA

Italia Libera–Popolari Italiani-Popolari per l'Europa-Liberali per l'Italia–Italian Liberal Party

Diritti e Libertà

Democratic Centre

Fareitalia per la Costituente Popolare

Movement for the Autonomies–Alleati per il Sud

Republicans–Azionisti

Autonomy South–Lega Sud Ausonia–Popoli Sovrani d'Europa

Iniziativa liberale

Liberal Democrats–MAIE

Linguistic Minorities

Lega Nord

Union of the Centre

Future and Freedom

People and Territory

Italy of Values

References 

 
Lists of political office-holders in Italy
Lists of legislators by term
Lists of members of parliament